John Caldwell (7 May 1938 in Belfast – 10 July 2009) was an Irish boxer who won the bronze medal in the flyweight (– 51 kg) division at the 1956 Summer Olympics in Melbourne.

Caldwell was considered a supreme fighter whose class and skill saw him claim a medal in 1956 and the world bantamweight crown in 1961. He enjoyed a magnificent career as an amateur and professional in which he contested 275 bouts, winning on all but ten occasions.

Background
Born in Belfast's Cyprus Street in 1938 Caldwell was drawn to the world-famous Immaculata Club at an early age. Caldwell's natural talent came to the attention of trainer Jack McCusker and he rose to prominence throughout Ireland.

1956 Summer Olympics
By 1956, the Falls Road boxer held both the junior and senior Irish flyweight titles and a place on the Irish team at the Melbourne 1956 Summer Olympics was assured. "We were away for six weeks and went to San Francisco and then stopped off in Honolulu on the way to Australia ... [I] was very young at the time and at just eighteen I was considered to be the baby of the team. The athlete Maeve Kyle looked after us all and it was the most successful set of Irish boxers ever to go to an Olympics as we won four bronze medals. But it was such an honour to be picked and I was so overjoyed to be representing Ireland on such a stage." 

In his opening bout, Caldwell was afforded a bye. His next opponent, Yaishwe (from Burma) was knocked out in the third round. In the quarterfinal, Caldwell beat on points Warner Batchelor, an Australian, who had been the favourite for the gold medal. However, in the semi-final, he lost out to Romanian Mircea Dobrescu and had to content himself with a bronze medal.

On his return, Caldwell was welcomed back to his native Cyprus Street. "The whole street was out to cheer me on my return to Belfast and to have stood on that podium in Melbourne with my medal just made me so proud".  The calling to the paid ranks was not far off. In January 1958, he fought his last unpaid fight in Belfast's St Mary's Hall.

Professional career
Caldwell moved to Scotland to begin his professional career. Glasgow was to be the base from where Caldwell, under the management of Sammy Docherty, set out on a new era. In his first bout, a two-round stoppage of Englishman Billy Downer signalled the start of John's rise through the ranks. As Caldwell recalled, the training regime he followed required discipline, self-control and dedication. "In Glasgow, I attended mass at half-six every morning ... [A]fter that, I would take to the hills outside the city for the running and stamina training. I had to watch my diet and keep myself right that it was really tough going. My exercise routines were so varied and beneficial that the Glasgow Celtic manager Jimmy McGrory asked me to go along and help the team out."

After six successful bouts in Scotland, Caldwell made his return to Belfast where he out pointed the Spaniard Esteban Martin in late 1958. His career continued to flourish and two years later he claimed the British flyweight title when knocked out the holder Frankie Jones at the King's Hall.
With a Lonsdale Belt to his name, Caldwell became a natural contender for higher honours. In due course, he moved up a weight to bantamweight and a world and European title fight was arranged with the French-Algerian fighter Alphonse Halimi.

The fight, which took place in London in May 1961, went the full distance and Caldwell was awarded the points decision to become the first Irishman since Rinty Monaghan in 1948 to win a world title. The fight was remembered by Caldwell. "Halimi was very, very dangerous man and a hard hitter ...[H]is was constantly at me and I couldn't take my eyes off him for a split second – the fight was one of the hardest of my career. I remember that I knocked him down in the last round and got the decision in the end. I was on top of the world and knew that it had been a great achievement."

As champion, Caldwell won two further bouts before defeating Halimi on points in a rematch at Wembley. In February 1962, a unification bout for the bantamweight title of the world was arranged for São Paulo in Brazil, where Caldwell was to face the legendary Eder Jofre. The Brazilian gradually got on top to stop Caldwell in the tenth. Caldwell, who had been accompanied by his father on the trip, spoke of his memories. "Eder Jofre was the greatest bantamweight and the hardest-hitter for his weight of all time ... [I] remember the place was packed to the rafters and there were many thousands locked outside the arena. As it turned out, it was my first defeat as a professional and it was hard to take." While Caldwell sought to regain his title, a chance to guarantee a rematch with Jofre turned up rather closer to home.

Caldwell v Gilroy
North Belfast's Freddie Gilroy had been a friend and rival of Caldwell in both the amateur and professional ranks. Gilroy had made a name for himself in the world bantamweight division and a clash with Caldwell for the British and Empire titles was set for the King's Hall on Saturday, 20 October 1962. 
The prize at stake was a crack at Jofre and a record crowd of 15,000 were in attendance. Gilroy, the underdog, won the fight when Caldwell was forced to retire with a cut eye at the end of the ninth round. For the victor, there was to be no crack at Jofre, only speculation of a rematch, which would have been a promoter's dream. However, the rematch never took place as Gilroy retired after the King's Hall clash.

Gilroy is on the record as saying that in his view the fight was a needless one that should never have taken place. There is no doubt that the media hyped the occasion as a grudge match between North Belfast's Gilroy and West Belfast's Caldwell. For Caldwell, due to the damage his eyes received during the fight, it was a bout that signalled the waning of his career.
"I thought truly that I was ahead when the fight was stopped and I really wanted a rematch with Freddie ... [I] had a feeling though when I saw him afterwards that he would never fight me again and I was proved right in the end. In that fight, I suffered very severe cut eyes and after that I was always having difficulty with my eyes."

Professional boxing record 

| style="text-align:center;" colspan="8"|29 Wins (14 KOs), 5 Losses
|-  style="text-align:center; background:#e3e3e3;"
|  style="border-style:none none solid solid; "|Res.
|  style="border-style:none none solid solid; "|Record
|  style="border-style:none none solid solid; "|Opponent
|  style="border-style:none none solid solid; "|Type
|  style="border-style:none none solid solid; "|Round,Time
|  style="border-style:none none solid solid; "|Date
|  style="border-style:none none solid solid; "|Location
|  style="border-style:none none solid solid; "|Notes
|- align=center
|Loss
|29–5–1
|align=left| Monty Laud
|
|
|
|align=left|
|
|- align=center
|Loss
|29–4–1
|align=left| Alan Rudkin
|
|
|
|align=left|
|
|- align=center
|Win
|29–3–1
|align=left| Orizu Obilaso
|
|
|
|align=left|
|
|- align=center
|style="background:#abcdef;"|Draw
|28–3–1
|align=left| Jackie Brown
|
|
|
|align=left|
|
|- align=center
|Win
|28–3
|align=left| Rafael Fernandez
|
|
|
|align=left|
|
|- align=center
|Win
|27–3
|align=left| George Bowes
|
|
|
|align=left|
|
|- align=center
|Loss
|26–3
|align=left| Michael Atlan
|
|
|
|align=left|
|
|- align=center
|Loss
|26–2
|align=left| Freddie Gilroy
|
|
|
|align=left|
|
|- align=center
|Win
|26–1
|align=left| Federico Scarponi
|
|
|
|align=left|
|
|- align=center
|Loss
|25–1
|align=left| Eder Jofre
|
|
|
|align=left|
|align=left|
|- align=center
|Win
|25–0
|align=left| Alphonse Halimi
|
|
|
|align=left|
|align=left|
|- align=center
|Win
|24–0
|align=left| Juan Cardenas
|
|
|
|align=left|
|
|- align=center
|Win
|23–0
|align=left| Pierre Vetroff
|
|
|
|align=left|
|
|- align=center
|Win
|22–0
|align=left| Alphonse Halimi
|
|
|
|align=left|
|align=left|
|- align=center
|Win
|21–0
|align=left| Jacques Jacob
|
|
|
|align=left|
|
|- align=center
|Win
|20–0
|align=left| Angelo Rampin
|
|
|
|align=left|
|
|- align=center
|Win
|19–0
|align=left| Christian Marchand
|
|
|
|align=left|
|
|- align=center
|Win
|18–0
|align=left| Frankie Jones
|
|
|
|align=left|
|
|- align=center
|Win
|17–0
|align=left| Rene Libeer
|
|
|
|align=left|
|
|- align=center
|Win
|16–0
|align=left| Risto Luukkonen
|
|
|
|align=left|
|
|- align=center
|Win
|15–0
|align=left| Young Martin
|
|
|
|align=left|
|
|- align=center
|Win
|14–0
|align=left| Salvatore Manca
|
|
|
|align=left|
|
|- align=center
|Win
|13–0
|align=left| Salvatore Manca
|
|
|
|align=left|
|
|- align=center
|Win
|12–0
|align=left| Giacomo Spano
|
|
|
|align=left|
|
|- align=center
|Win
|11–0
|align=left| Pierre Rossi
|
|
|
|align=left|
|
|- align=center
|Win
|10–0
|align=left| Francisco Carreno
|
|
|
|align=left|
|
|- align=center
|Win
|9–0
|align=left| Henri Schmid
|
|
|
|align=left|
|
|- align=center
|Win
|8–0
|align=left| Simon Carnazza
|
|
|
|align=left|
|
|- align=center
|Win
|7–0
|align=left| Esteban Martin
|
|
|
|align=left|
|
|- align=center
|Win
|6–0
|align=left| Juanito Cid
|
|
|
|align=left|
|
|- align=center
|Win
|5–0
|align=left| Dennis Adams
|
|
|
|align=left|
|
|- align=center
|Win
|4–0
|align=left| Michel Lamora
|
|
|
|align=left|
|
|- align=center
|Win
|3–0
|align=left| Moncef Fabri
|
|
|
|align=left|
|
|- align=center
|Win
|2–0
|align=left| Eddie Barraclough
|
|
|
|align=left|
|
|- align=center
|Win
|1–0
|align=left| Billy Downer
|
|
|
|align=left|
|

Commonwealth title and retirement
Caldwell's career continued. However, his problem with cut eyes came back to haunt him just three months later when he was forced to retire from a bout with Michel Atlan at the Albert Hall. Caldwell won the Commonwealth and British bantamweight titles in 1964 with a win over George Bowes at Belfast's Ritz Cinema. A year later, with two further victories under his belt, he was forced to retire in the tenth round against Alan Rudkin in a defence of his titles. At age 27, Caldwell had had enough of professional boxing. In 1965, he lost his final bout on points to Monty Laud in Nottingham and returned to his trade as a pipe-fitter in Belfast.

When asked about his views on contemporary boxing, Caldwell replied: "It was an entirely different game to the one that I was involved in fifty years ago ... [Y]ou had to be totally dedicated back then, clean-living and prepared to make a lot of sacrifices to survive at the top. It was a game for hard and skilful men and if you couldn't stick the pace you were found out very easily."

Death
Caldwell died following a long battle with cancer, aged 71.

See also
 List of British bantamweight boxing champions
 List of British flyweight boxing champions

References

External links
 
 

1938 births
2009 deaths
Boxers at the 1956 Summer Olympics
Male boxers from Northern Ireland
Deaths from cancer in Northern Ireland
Flyweight boxers
Olympic bronze medalists for Ireland
Olympic boxers of Ireland
Boxers from Belfast
Olympic medalists in boxing
Medalists at the 1956 Summer Olympics